James Michael Hicks (born 16 September 1960) is an English former professional footballer and coach. In December 2006 Hicks became senior executive head of coaching at the Professional Footballers' Association (PFA). He had a long association with Millwall FC's community department which included managing the club's affiliated female team, Millwall Lionesses.

Playing career
Hicks played Non-League football while completing his education, then made his Football League debut with Exeter City in 1983–84. After three appearances as a non–contract player, he spent the following season with Oxford United without featuring in the first team.

In the summer of 1985, Oxford sent Hicks, Gary Barnett and around £150,000 to Fulham in exchange for Ray Houghton. Over the next three seasons Hicks' whole–hearted displays in central defence won over the Fulham supporters, although other players were considered to be more talented.

In 1989, Hicks played for Washington Stars in the American Soccer League. He also played for Madison United Soccer Club in the United States.

Coaching career
Hicks worked for Millwall's community scheme, which was established during the 1980s to rid the club of its negative associations with hooliganism and racism. As manager of Millwall Lionesses, Hicks guided the club to an FA Women's Cup and FA Women's Premier League Cup double in 1997. Under his leadership the Lionesses produced several England international players including Mary Phillip and Katie Chapman.

In 2008, Hicks obtained the UEFA Pro Licence, the highest football coaching award available in Europe.

Honours

Manager

Club
Millwall Lionesses
FA Women's Cup (1): 1996–97
FA Women's Premier League Cup (1): 1996–97

References

External links 
Playerhistory.com 
Scienceandfootball.com

1960 births
Living people
Footballers from Suffolk
Sportspeople from Ipswich
English footballers
English football managers
Newmarket Town F.C. players
Soham Town Rangers F.C. players
Coventry City F.C. players
Exeter City F.C. players
Oxford United F.C. players
Fulham F.C. players
Washington Stars players
Farnborough F.C. players
Kingstonian F.C. players
Baldock Town F.C. players
St Albans City F.C. players
Wealdstone F.C. players
Ely City F.C. players
Downham Town F.C. players
English Football League players
American Soccer League (1988–89) players
Alumni of the University of Warwick
National League (English football) players
Association football central defenders
English expatriate sportspeople in the United States
Expatriate soccer players in the United States
English expatriate footballers